Thomas Edward Youd Seddon (2 July 1884 – 22 January 1972) was a New Zealand politician of the Liberal Party, and a lawyer in Greymouth. He was the son of New Zealand's longest-serving Prime Minister Richard Seddon, and succeeded his father as MP for Westland following his death in 1906.

Early life
Seddon was born in Kumara in 1884. His parents were Richard and Louisa Jane Seddon (née Spotswood). He was educated at Kumara School, the Terrace School (Wellington), Wellington College, and Victoria University College. He graduated in law, and joined the practice of John Findlay and Frederick George Dalziell, and then became a barrister and solicitor in Greymouth.

He served in the New Zealand Army in World War I from 1915 to 1919. Because he received a leg injury in a rugby game "behind the trenches" he was not gassed like the rest of his unit. Later he was chairman of the War Pensions Board, from 1930 to 1963, and in World War II he was Captain of the Wadestown Home Guard.

He married Beatrice Ann Wood on 15 March 1922 at St Mary's Church in the Christchurch suburb of Merivale. Guests at the wedding included Robert Loughnan, Joseph Grimmond, George Fowlds, and Joseph Ward.

Political career

He held the electorate to 1922, when he was defeated by James O'Brien of the Labour Party.

He was chairman of the War Pensions Board from 1930 to 1963, having served in the New Zealand Army in World War I,

In 1935, he was awarded the King George V Silver Jubilee Medal. His son, Dick Seddon, was for several decades electorate secretary and organiser for the New Zealand National Party.

Bibliography

His autobiography was published in 1968:

Notes and references

Citations

References 

Who’s Who in New Zealand (1968, 9th edition)

External links 

1884 births
1972 deaths
People educated at Wellington College (New Zealand)
Members of the Cabinet of New Zealand
20th-century New Zealand lawyers
New Zealand Liberal Party MPs
New Zealand military personnel of World War I
Victoria University of Wellington alumni
Members of the New Zealand House of Representatives
New Zealand MPs for South Island electorates
Unsuccessful candidates in the 1922 New Zealand general election
Unsuccessful candidates in the 1928 New Zealand general election
People from Kumara, New Zealand
Children of prime ministers of New Zealand
Tom